Noma D. Gurich (born September 26, 1952) is an American attorney and jurist who is serving as an associate justice of the Oklahoma Supreme Court. Gurich was appointed the State's highest court by Governor Brad Henry in 2010 and assumed office on February 15, 2011. Gurich was appointed to the Court following the death of long-time Justice Marian P. Opala. Gurich is the third woman in state history after Alma Wilson and Yvonne Kauger to be appointed to the Supreme Court.

Biography
Gurich was born in South Bend, Indiana. She received a bachelor's degree in political science in 1975 from Indiana State University and a Juris Doctor from the University of Oklahoma College of Law in 1978. She was a lawyer in private practice in Oklahoma City ten years later when Republican Governor Henry Bellmon appointed her a judge of the Oklahoma Workers' Compensation Court. She was reappointed for a second term to that court by Democratic Governor David Walters in 1994.

In July 1998, Republican governor Frank Keating appointed Gurich as judge of the District Court for Oklahoma County, a position she was then reelected to in 2002, 2006, and 2010. While serving as a district judge, Gurich served as the presiding judge of both the 11th and 12th Multi-County Grand Juries (2007–2008 and 2009–2010) by order of the chief justice of the Oklahoma Supreme Court. In January 2011, following the death of long-time Justice Marian P. Opala, Democratic governor Brad Henry appointed Gurch to the Oklahoma Supreme Court.

Gurich is married to John E. Miley, general counsel for the Oklahoma Employment Security Commission.  Justice Gurich and her husband have been married for 17 years.

Education

While in law school, Gurich was selected by a vote of her peers to receive the Professional Responsibility Award, and served as a student judge on the University of Oklahoma Superior Court. She also served as a Research Editor for the American Indian Law Review.

Employment

Throughout law school, Gurich maintained employment with a number of organizations.  Gurich worked on campus as a student government associate, and as a member of the Student Legal Research Board.  In 1976, Gurich served as a student assistant for the United States Attorney for the Western District of Oklahoma, working under acting U.S. Attorney John E. Green.

Private practice

Upon graduation from law school, Justice Gurich was admitted to the Oklahoma Bar Association on October 13, 1978.  Initially, Gurich was employed as an associate attorney with the law firm of Cheek and Cheek in Oklahoma City.  In 1982, she joined the firm of Abowitz & Welch, in Oklahoma City, with whom she became a partner.  Her private practice experience included the defense of negligence and tort cases, product liability cases, anti-trust cases, securities fraud cases, contract cases, workers' compensation and general practice.

Judicial career

Workers Compensation Court

Justice Gurich has the distinction of receiving nominations to fill judicial vacancies by four separate Oklahoma Governors, with two of them being Republican and two being Democrats.

In 1988, Gurich was appointed to serve as a judge on the Workers' Compensation Court by Oklahoma Governor Henry Bellmon.  While sitting on the Workers' Compensation Court, Gurich was designated by Governor Bellmon to serve as presiding judge for two terms: January 1989 – December 1992.  Gurich was re-appointed to the court for a six-year term by Oklahoma Governor David Walters.  She remained in this position until being nominated to serve as judge in the District Court of Oklahoma County.

District Court
Gurich began her career as a district judge on July 1, 1998.  In accordance with Oklahoma's judicial procedure, she was nominated by the Oklahoma Judicial Nominating Commission and formally appointed by Governor Frank Keating to fill the remaining term of a retiring district judge.

Following the appointment, Gurich was elected in 1998 to remain in her position as a district judge for Oklahoma County.  She was re-elected in 2002, 2006 & 2010 without opposition.  In this capacity, Gurich served as the Presiding Administrative Judge for the 7th Judicial District from January 2003 to December 31, 2004.

Supreme Court

In 2010, after receiving the commission's recommendation, Gurich was again nominated by the Oklahoma Judicial Nominating Commission to fill a vacancy in the Oklahoma Supreme Court, following the death of Justice Marian Opala on October 11, 2010. She was sworn in on March 31, 2011, to serve as the third woman on the Oklahoma Supreme Court.  Justice Gurich was sworn in by fellow justice, Yvonne Kauger.

On November 18, 2018, she was elected chief judge by her peers. Her term as chief judge started on January 1, 2019 and ended on December 31, 2020.

References

External links
Official State biography of Justice Noma Gurich
Meet Judge Gurich

|-

1952 births
Living people
21st-century American judges
21st-century American women judges
Chief Justices of the Oklahoma Supreme Court
Indiana State University alumni
Lawyers from Oklahoma City
Justices of the Oklahoma Supreme Court
People from South Bend, Indiana
Politicians from Oklahoma City
University of Oklahoma College of Law alumni
Women chief justices of state supreme courts in the United States